is a passenger railway station located in the city of Kasukabe, Saitama, Japan, operated by the private railway operator Tōbu Railway. The station is numbered "TD-12".

Lines

Station layout
The station consists of two ground-level opposing side platforms serving two tracks, with an elevated station building located above.

Platforms

Adjacent stations

History
On 1 August 1932 it was relocated 400 meters towards Kashiwa and elevated in status to a full station with its present name. On 6 November 1943, a new station named  was established 800 meters in the direction of Kashiwa for freight operations. This station ceased operations on 30 September 1945, and was abolished on 23 December 1956, and Minami-sakurai Station was relocated to its location.
From 17 March 2012, station numbering was introduced on the Tobu Noda Line, with Minami-sakurai Station becoming "TD-12".

Passenger statistics
In fiscal 2019, the station was used by an average of 14,515 passengers daily.

Surrounding area
  Metropolitan Area Outer Underground Discharge Channel ("G-Cans")
 Former Shōwa, Saitama Town Hall
 Shōwa Post Office

See also
 List of railway stations in Japan

References

External links

 Station information (Tobu) 

Railway stations in Saitama Prefecture
Tobu Noda Line
Stations of Tobu Railway
Railway stations in Japan opened in 1930
Kasukabe, Saitama